Oh! Pleasant Hope is the sixth album by American rock group Blue Cheer, and their final album until 1984's The Beast Is Back. It features less psychedelia and hard rock and includes more folk rock elements. This is an unusual Blue Cheer album in that Dickie Peterson only sings lead on three songs. Another unusual aspect is that the song "I'm the Light" features extensive use of the sitar and synthesizer, although on the previous album The Original Human Being the song "Babaji (Twilight Raga)" also featured extensive use of the aforementioned instruments.

Track listing
"Hiway Man" (Gary R. Grelecki, Norman Mayell, Gary Yoder) – 4:22
"Believer" (Gary R. Grelecki, Gary Lee Yoder) – 3:41
"Money Troubles" (Dr. Richard Peddicord) – 4:02
"Traveling Man" (Gary R. Grelecki, Gary Lee Yoder) – 3:10
"Oh! Pleasant Hope" (Dr. Richard Peddicord) – 2:39
"I'm the Light" (Kent Housman, Norman Mayell) – 5:39
"Ecological Blues" (Norman Mayell) – 2:26
"Lester the Arrester" (Ralph Burns Kellogg) – 3:02
"Heart Full of Soul" (Dickie Peterson)– 4:37

Personnel
Dickie Peterson – bass, vocals
Norman Mayell – drums, guitar, sitar, vocals
Gary Yoder – acoustic and electric guitars, harp, vocals
Ralph Burns Kellogg – organ, piano, synthesizer, bass
with:
Bob Gurland - Mouth Trumpet
Kent Housman - Dobro, Backing Vocals
Cynthia Jobse - Harp
Jim Keylor - Bass
Douglas Killmer - Bass
Jack May - Guitar
Dehner Patten - Guitar
Dr. Richard Peddicord - Guitar, Vocals
Ronald Stallings - Saxophone

References

1971 albums
Blue Cheer albums
Philips Records albums